is a 2010 samurai film directed by Takashi Miike, and starring Kōji Yakusho, Takayuki Yamada, Sōsuke Takaoka, Hiroki Matsukata, Kazuki Namioka and Gorō Inagaki. A remake of Eiichi Kudo's 1963 Japanese period drama film 13 Assassins, it is set in 1844 toward the end of the Edo period in which a group of thirteen assassins—comprising twelve samurai and a hunter—secretly plot to assassinate Lord Matsudaira Naritsugu, the murderous leader of the Akashi clan, to thwart his appointment to the powerful Shogunate Council.

The film marks the third collaboration in which Yamada and Takaoka co-starred, the first two being Crows Zero and Crows Zero 2, both directed by Miike. Principal photography took place over two months, from July to September 2009, in Tsuruoka, Yamagata, in northern Japan. The film opened in Japan on 25September 2010 and in the United States on 29April 2011. It received critical acclaim from western critics, who compared it favourably to Akira Kurosawa's oeuvre.

Plot
In the year 1844 of the Edo Period, as the Tokugawa Shogunate is in decline, the sadistic Lord Matsudaira Naritsugu of Akashi rapes, tortures, mutilates and murders nobles and commoners at will. He is shielded because the Shōgun is his half-brother. Sir Doi Toshitsura, the Shōgun's Justice Minister, realizes that when Naritsugu ascends to the Shogunate Council, civil war will break out between the Shōgun and the many feudal lords Naritsugu has offended. Then, the feudal lord of the Mamiya clan publicly commits seppuku as a protest against the Shōgun's refusal to punish Lord Naritsugu, who has personally murdered the feudal lord's entire family. When the Shōgun still insists upon Naritsugu's promotion, SirDoi seeks out a trusted older samurai, Shimada Shinzaemon, who served under the former shōgun, and secretly hires him to assassinate Naritsugu. However, Naritsugu's loyal retainers led by Hanbei, an old contemporary of Shinzaemon, learn of the plot by spying on Doi.

Shinzaemon gathers eleven trusted samurai including Shinzaemon's nephew, Shinrokurō, who together plan to ambush Naritsugu on his official journey from Edo to his lands in Akashi. Just before they leave, Hanbei arrives and warns his old colleague that he will suffer grave consequences if he tries to kill Naritsugu.

The group, with the legal authority and financial assistance of Doi, buy the help of the town of Ochiai in order to create a trap. They also enlist the help of Makino, a feudal lord whose daughter-in-law was raped and son murdered by Naritsugu. With troops, Makino blocks the official highway, forcing Naritsugu to head into the trap; Makino then disembowels himself to conceal his own involvement in the conspiracy. During the assassins' journey to the town, they are attacked by rōnin who have been paid off by Hanbei to kill the plotters. The group decides to head through the mountains but end up getting lost. In the process they encounter a hunter named Kiga Koyata who becomes their guide and later the thirteenth assassin.

The town is converted into an elaborate maze of booby traps and camouflaged fortifications. When Naritsugu and his retinue arrive, their numbers have been augmented by additional troops. The 13 assassins are no longer facing 70 men-at-arms; now they face at least 200. A lengthy battle follows, with Naritsugu and his guards trapped inside the village and attacked on all sides by arrows, explosives, knives, and swords - with the exception of Koyata, who fights with rocks in slings and with sticks. In the midst of the carnage, the sadistic Naritsugu is aroused by the bloodshed of the battle. He tells Hanbei that when he ascends to the Shōgun's council he will bring back the wars of the Sengoku Period.

The assassins are killed one by one, but not before they kill nearly all of the Akashi forces. Eventually, Naritsugu and Hanbei, along with two retainers, are the last remaining of the Naritsugu's party, and are confronted by Shinzaemon and Shinrokurō. After Shinzaemon kills Hanbei, Naritsugu kicks his loyal retainer's head away, insulting the samurai who has given his life for him. Contemptuously, he announces that the people and the samurai have only one purpose: to serve their lords. Shinzaemon counters by telling Naritsugu that lords cannot live without the support of the people and that, if a lord abuses his power, the people will always rise up against him. Naritsugu and Shinzaemon mortally wound each other. Crying, crawling in the mud, and experiencing fear and pain for the first time, the lord thanks Shinzaemon for showing him excitement. Shinzaemon then decapitates him.

Shinrokurō wanders through the carnage and meets the hunter Koyata who, having suffered a fatal injury earlier, runs up to him with characteristic vigor, unharmed. They make their separate ways out of the town after they briefly discuss how they intend to live their lives from then onwards. An epilogue states that the Shōgun and his government covered up what really occurred, announcing that Naritsugu died of illness on the journey back to his lands. Twenty-three years later, the Tokugawa Shogunate would be overthrown during the Meiji Restoration.

Cast

{{hatnote|Character names follow the pattern of Japanese names, with the family surname placed first.}}
 Gorō Inagaki as Lord Matsudaira Naritsugu: The ruler of the Akashi Domain. His violent atrocities in his land have gone unpunished since he is protected by the Shōgun, who is his half-brother.
 Mikijirō Hira as Sir Doi Toshitsura: The senior advisor to the Shogunate Council. Alarmed that Naritsugu has been considered by the Shōgun for a political position on the council, he hires Shinzaemon to kill Naritsugu beforehand.
 Kōji Yakusho as Shimada Shinzaemon: A war-weary, decorated samurai who believes that there is more to Bushido than blind obedience. Convinced that there was no chance for an honorable death, he is deeply elated when hired to carry out the mission. He assembles a group of eleven samurai to plot an ambush on Naritsugu's annual journey from Edo to his land in Akashi. 
 Seiji Rokkaku as Otake Mosuke
 Hiroki Matsukata as Kuranaga Saheita: Second-in-command to Shinzaemon, another veteran samurai who volunteers his best and most trusted students for the mission
 Tsuyoshi Ihara as Hirayama Kujūrō: A masterless samurai of unmatched swordsmanship, who trained under Shinzaemon
 Takayuki Yamada as Shimada Shinrokurō: Shinzaemon's nephew, who has strayed from Bushido to become a gambler and a womanizer. Bored and ashamed, he joins the mission to redeem himself.
 Yūsuke Iseya as Kiga Koyata: A hunter who is found suspended in a cage in the forest as a punishment for seducing his boss's wife and aids the assassins in finding a route to Ochiai. He is eventually recruited by Shinzaemon as the thirteenth assassin. Although not explicitly stated, it is heavily implied that he is a supernatural entity.

Production13 Assassins was produced through Toshiaki Nakazawa's film outfit, Sedic International, and Jeremy Thomass Recorded Picture Company. Nakazawa had previously worked with director Takashi Miike on The Bird People in China and Andromedia (both in 1998), Yakuza Demon (2003), and Sukiyaki Western Django (2007). At the start of production, Thomas said he was pleased to be working again with "wonderful Japanese filmmakers like Toshiaki Nakazawa and Takashi Miike, whose work speaks for itself as being amongst the most successful and innovative coming from Japan". Nakazawa replied that he would like Thomas "to wear a sword also, and with one more assassin, together we will send out the fourteen assassins over there". Of his approach in directing the film, Miike said:

Having been a fan of Kōji Yakusho's acting, Miike made it a priority that he be cast in the leading role. In addition, he sought younger actors to play the assassins, in particular Sousuke Takaoka and Takayuki Yamada, with whom Miike had worked in his two films, Crows Zero (2007) and its sequel Crows Zero 2 (2009). The film's screenplay was written by Daisuke Tengan, who had also written the screenplay for Miike's film Audition (1999).

The film entered production over a two-month period. Principal photography began in July 2009 on a large open-air set in Tsuruoka in the Yamagata Prefecture in northern Japan. The filming of the action scenes took about three weeks and was met with minor weather-related difficulties. Miike had strayed from the use of CGI in the film as well as planning the scenes via storyboarding, insisting on shooting the scenes right away. In a separate interview, however, Miike said that some CGI were used, albeit minimal. Over half of the thirteen actors playing the assassins were reportedly inexperienced in sword fighting and horseback riding, and Miike wanted them to be just that, explaining, "If the actors had been skilled from the beginning, and had been in several samurai movies before, the way they approached the action would've been different; they probably would've ended up being something they were doing to look good or be beautiful, or to fall into the trappings of the stereotypical form that they had." Filming concluded in early September 2009.

Release
For international exhibition, the 141 minute film was edited to 125 minutes.

Theatrical run
Jeremy Thomass London-based company HanWay Films handled international sales. Toho had prebought the rights to distribute in Japan, and released it on 25 September 2010. The film competed for the Golden Lion at the 67th Venice International Film Festival on 9 September 2010.

Magnet Releasing, a genre arm of Magnolia Pictures, acquired North American distribution rights. The film streamed video on demand in March 2011, and was released theatrically in the United States on 29April.

At the box office, 13 Assassins grossed $802,778 in the US and Canada. From an estimated $6 million budget, it grossed $17,555,141 worldwide.

Critical reception13 Assassins drew good reviews from critics, many of whom praised its final battle sequence (which runs 45 minutes). Rotten Tomatoes gives a score of 95%, with an average rating of 7.9 out of 10, based on reviews from 128 critics. The consensus reads, "Takashi Miike's electric remake of Eiichi Kudo's 1963 period action film is a wild spectacle executed with killer, dizzying panache." On Metacritic, the film received "Universal acclaim" and was awarded its "Must-See" badge, with a weighted average of 84 out of 100 based on 33 reviews.

Roger Ebert of the Chicago Sun-Times, who gave the film 3 stars out of 4, praised the film as "terrifically entertaining, an ambitious big-budget epic, directed with great visuals and sound", and compared it favorably with other action films in its subtle use of CGI effects. Ebert also praised the way the film "focuses on story in the midst of violence", as well as incorporating characters and drama with a skill that most blockbuster action films lack. Ebert later included it in his Best Films of 2011 list as an addendum to his top 20. Manohla Dargis chose 13 Assassins as her Critic's Pick for The New York Times, describing it as "A stirring, unexpectedly moving story of love and blood".

V.A. Musetto of the New York Post said the film complements Akira Kurosawa's Seven Samurai (1954) and Ran (1985), describing Miike's film as "a pulse-quickening masterpiece that would please the mighty Kurosawa". Mark Schilling of The Japan Times commended Miike's direction and the performance of the ensemble cast (including Kōji Yakusho's). Schilling gave the film 4 stars out of 5, but, notwithstanding other favorable comparisons, he noted that it barely "strike[s] the deeper chords" of Seven Samurai. Tom Mes of Film Comment said the film "culminates in a riveting, ingeniously plotted, and inventively shot 45-minute battle scene that few contemporary Japanese directors besides Miike could pull off, either logistically or artistically". Leslie Felperin of Variety praised the film's technical aspects, describing Kenji Yamashita's editing as "gracefully executed", Kazuhiro Sawataishi's costume design as "terrific, character-defining", and Kōji Endō's soundtrack as "rousing, propulsive score".

Home media
The film's DVD and Blu-ray versions were released in the United States on 5July 2011 by Magnet Releasing, and in the United Kingdom on 5September by Artificial Eye. The DVD version was the 12th-bestselling DVD in its first week of availability in the US, selling 41,593 copies. In its second week, it dropped to 30th place, selling 13,922 copies. The Blu-ray version was the third-bestselling Blu-ray, selling 33,142 copies in its first week. In its second week, it dropped to 10,335 copies and was placed 20th. The Blu-ray version garnered positive reviews from IGN, DVD Talk, Slant Magazine, and HuffPost UK.

Accolades
In Japan, the film won four of its ten nominations at the 34th Japan Academy Prize, and won both of its two nominations at the 32nd Yokohama Film Festival. In 2014 Time Out polled several film critics, directors, actors, and stunt actors to list their top action films. 13 Assassins was listed at 94th place on the list. Rotten Tomatoes ranked the film at No. 70 on its list of the "140 Essential Action Movies To Watch Now", and was ranked at No. 5 on Screen Rant's "12 Best Action Movies You've Never Heard Of".  13 Assassins'' made the British Film Institute's list of 10 great samurai films.

References

External links 
 
 

2010 films
2010 action films
Films directed by Takashi Miike
Films produced by Jeremy Thomas
Films set in 1844
Japanese action war films
Remakes of Japanese films
2010s action war films
Jidaigeki films
Samurai films
Toho films
2010s Japanese films
2010s Japanese-language films